Q-Park is an operator of parking garages in  Belgium, Denmark, Germany, France, Ireland, the Netherlands, and the United Kingdom. Q-Park is the number two on the European parking market. In total Q-Park controls 800,000 parking spaces on more than 3,500 locations. The company is based in Maastricht.

In the Netherlands Q-Park is the largest private exploitant of parking spaces and controls more than 220 public parking lots and 76 park and rides near railway stations. In June 2008 Q-park bought the French company Epolia for 700 million euro.

External links

References 

Parking companies
Transport companies established in 1998